Purari may refer to:
Purari River, Papua New Guinea
Purari language, a Papuan language of Papua New Guinea